Publius Cornelius Scipio Nasica (c. 154 – 111 BC) was a politician of the Roman Republic. He belonged to the great patrician family of the Cornelii Scipiones, and was the son of the pontifex maximus Nasica Serapio, who famously murdered Tiberius Gracchus in 133 BC. Nasica was on track to a prestigious career like most of his ancestors, being praetor in 118 BC, but he died during his consulship in 111 BC.

Family
He was the matrilineal great-grandson of Scipio Africanus. He was married to Caecilia Metella, daughter of Quintus Caecilius Metellus Macedonicus. He had two children: Publius Cornelius Scipio Nasica, who married a daughter of the famous orator Lucius Licinius Crassus, and a daughter who married Publius Cornelius Lentulus Marcellinus. His son was praetor in 93 BC and the father of Quintus Caecilius Metellus Pius Scipio Nasica.

Footnotes

References

Bibliography

Ancient sources 
 Gaius Plinius Secundus (Pliny the Elder), Historia Naturalis (Natural History).

Modern sources 

 Henri Etcheto, Les Scipions. Famille et pouvoir à Rome à l’époque républicaine, Bordeaux, Ausonius Éditions, 2012.

150s BC births
Year of birth uncertain
111 BC deaths
2nd-century BC Roman consuls
1st-century BC Romans
Nasica, Publius (consul 643 AUC)
Roman patricians